Chatt is a surname. Notable people with the surname include:

 Bob Chatt (1870-1955), English footballer
 Chatt G. Wright, university president
 Hicham Chatt (born 1969), Moroccan long-distance runner
 Joseph Chatt (1914–1994), British scientist

See also
 Chattanooga, Tennessee